Tuapa is one of the fourteen villages of Niue. Its population at the 2017 census was 112, up from 97 in 2011.

Villagers from Tuapa established the villages of Makefu, Hikutavake, and Namukulu.

References

Populated places in Niue